Master Artisan Guitar Picks, also known as Nashville Picks is a brand of guitar picks created by Nashville, Tennessee musician, producer, artist and picksmith  Dustin Michael Headrick. These guitar picks are handcrafted from a variety of materials including antique metals, cymbals, coins, wood, glass, bone, animal horn, natural stone, clay, vinyl records, Acrylic and Formica (plastic). The guitar picks are recognized as being extremely aesthetic, having liquid smooth beveled edges that glide across the guitar strings without causing string wear, create a unique tonal palette, and improve the sound of the electric guitar and acoustic guitar.

Reviews & Press 
Master Artisan Guitar Picks have been extensively reviewed by guitarists, especially the artisan coin guitar picks, with many popular sources publishing public reviews such as 
Guitar Player Magazine, 
Uncrate, 
The Awesomer, 
Jared Leto, 
Metal Injection, OhGizmo!, 
Cool Material, 
HiConsumptionm, 
Technabob, 
NotCot, 
NeatORama, 
StupidDOPE, 
AxeJunction, 
Muted, 
Egotastic, 
BoingBoing, 
So Freaking Cool, 
DudeIWantThat, 
Werd, 
LaughingSquid, 
GuySpeed, 
BookOfJoe, 
SiloDrome, 
Complex, 
Like Cool, 
and The Strut.

In 2014, ABC affiliate WKRN-TV in Nashville, Tennessee broadcast and syndicated a story featuring Master Artisan Guitar Picks, featured George Gruhn of Gruhn Guitars and Stephen Flatt (great nephew of bluegrass legend Lester Flatt). 

In 2018, The Tennessean published an extensive story featuring Master Artisan Guitar Picks, Nashville Picks and Dustin Michael Headrick regarding the artist's past, present and future, and cites prominent customers such as UncommonGoods, Country Music Hall of Fame and Museum and Carter Vintage Guitars.

References 

Pick